Frederick Kennedy (23 October 1902 – 14 November 1963) was an English footballer who played as a forward.

References

External links
Profile
Profile

1902 births
1963 deaths
English footballers
English expatriate footballers
Rossendale United F.C. players
Manchester United F.C. players
Everton F.C. players
Middlesbrough F.C. players
Northwich Victoria F.C. players
Oldham Athletic A.F.C. players
Reading F.C. players
Racing Club de France Football players
Ligue 1 players
Expatriate footballers in France
Blackburn Rovers F.C. players
Stockport County F.C. players
Association football forwards